Oliver Kostić (born 20 February 1973) is a Serbian professional basketball coach who is an assistant coach for the Serbia national team.

Coaching career 
Between 2005 and 2010, Kostić was an assistant coach for Lottomatica Roma (Italy), Dynamo Moscow (Russia), and Crvena zvezda (Serbia); all under head coach Svetislav Pešić.

In April 2018, when Montenegrin coach Dejan Radonjić took over the Bayern Munich first team, Kostić advanced into his coaching team. On 7 January 2020, Bayern Munich parted ways with Dejan Radonjić and appointed Kostić as the new head coach for the rest of the 2019–20 season.

National team coaching career 

In November 2021, Kostić was named an assistant coach for the Serbia national team under Svetislav Pešić. He was a staff member at EuroBasket 2022.

References

External links 
 Oliver Kostic at fcb-basketball.de
 Coach Profile at eurobasket.com
 Coach Profile at realgm.com

1973 births
Living people
Guards (basketball)
BC Žalgiris coaches
FC Bayern Munich basketball coaches
KK Crvena zvezda assistant coaches
KK Pirot coaches
KK Pirot players
KK Spartak Subotica players
People from Pirot
Serbian expatriate basketball people in Bulgaria
Serbian expatriate basketball people in Germany
Serbian expatriate basketball people in Italy
Serbian expatriate basketball people in Lithuania
Serbian expatriate basketball people in Russia
Serbian men's basketball coaches
Serbian men's basketball players